The  is a series of four-wheel drive off-road mini SUVs, manufactured and marketed by Japanese automaker Suzuki since 1970.

Originally belonging to the kei class, Japan's light automobile tax/legal class, the company continues to market a kei-compliant version for the Japanese and global markets as the Jimny, as well as versions that exceed kei-class limitations. Suzuki has marketed 2.85 million Jimnys in 194 countries through September 2018.

History
The history of Suzuki four-wheel drive cars began in the latter half of the 1960s, when Suzuki bought a Steyr-Puch Haflinger to study with the intent of building a kei-class off-road vehicle. A better opportunity presented itself in 1968, when Suzuki was able to buy bankrupt Japanese automaker Hope Motor Company, which had introduced a small off-road vehicle called the HopeStar ON360. The tiny Hope company had been unable to enter series production, and only about 45 were manufactured. The first Suzuki-branded four-wheel drive, the LJ10 (Light Jeep 10), was introduced in 1970. The LJ10 had a 359-cc, air-cooled, two-stroke, in-line two-cylinder engine. The liquid-cooled LJ20 was introduced in 1972 with the cooling changed due to newly enacted emission regulations, and it gained 3 hp. In 1975, Suzuki complemented the LJ20 with the LJ50, which had a larger 539 cc, two-stroke, in-line three-cylinder engine and bigger differentials. This was originally targeted at the Australian market, but more exports soon followed.

The Jimny8/LJ80 was an updated version of the LJ50 with an 800 cc, four-stroke, in-line four-cylinder engine, followed by the Jimny 1000/SJ410 and Jimny 1300/SJ413. An updated version of the SJ413 became known as the Samurai and was the first Suzuki officially marketed in the US. The series from SJ410 to SJ413 was known as the Sierra in Australia, and remained the Jimny in some markets.

The new Jimny was released in 1998, and now bears the same name in all markets. The 1998 release used the G13BB EFI engine, replaced by the M13AA EFI engine in 2001 and the M13AA variable valve timing engine in 2005, in conjunction with a minor interior redesign.

Common design characteristics

Overall construction
All four Jimny generations have separate frame and body ("ladder frame chassis"). The body has no structural carrying role. It serves only as a cabin to protect the occupants from the elements, provide comfort, and protect them in the case of a crash.

Suspension
All four Jimny generations have dependent suspension (solid-beam axles) both at the front and rear axles. This used to be a common suspension design for all-terrain vehicles up to 1990s, but has become a rarity in vehicle design in the 21st century. Dependent suspension is particularly well suited for all-terrain duty, both from the durability and performance perspectives.

The first two Jimny generations used leaf-sprung suspension at all four wheels, with the third and fourth generations using coil-sprung suspension at all four wheels. Some late second-generation models had coil-sprung suspension, as well.

Steering
All four Jimny generations have recirculating ball steering mechanism, which is particularly well suited for all-terrain duty, but relatively imprecise on-road compared to modern rack-and-pinion steering construction.

Transmission
All four Jimny generations have manually user-selectable part-time four-wheel drive (4WD) transmission, where the default (on-road) transmission mode is two-wheel drive (rear-wheel drive). Rear-wheel drive can never be disengaged. The user, however, can (dis)engage the front-wheel drive (FWD) manually at any time under certain operating conditions. When FWD is also engaged, this provides 4WD.

Jimnys have no centre (interaxle) differential. This has a positive effect that at least two wheels, where each wheel is on a different axle, have to lose traction  for the vehicle to lose traction when in 4WD transmission mode. However, the negative effect is that 4WD transmission mode must not be used on any surface not rather slippery, especially if having to steer. In other words, 4WD transmission mode should be used only on rather slippery surfaces, like snow, ice, mud, loose gravel, wet grass, and sand. Wet asphalt, wet concrete, and hard-packed gravel are not considered slippery enough.

All four Jimny generations have manually user-selectable dual-ratio (dual-range) gearing mechanism. The two ratios or ranges are called "high range" (for regular on-road driving and light to moderate all-terrain driving) and "low range" (for moderate to hard all-terrain driving and for all-terrain towing). The overall transmission gearing ratio is exactly halved when the vehicle is in low=range transmission mode. This has the effect of the vehicle moving about half as fast, but with double torque at the wheels in any transmission gear. For example, the fourth gear in low range behaves similar to the second gear in high range, and third gear in low range behaves similarly as "1.5th gear" in high range.
The transmission gearing range is selectable only when the vehicle is in 4WD transmission mode. Therefore, low range cannot be used for on-road towing.

The (dis)engagement of 4WD transmission mode and the switch from one gearing range to another is performed by a dedicated transfer case mechanical unit, which is separate from the regular gear box unit. All four Jimny generations have a transfer case with an attached selection lever protruding in the cabin between the main gear box lever and the handbrake lever. The lever allows the user to select 2WD-H, 4WD-H or 4WD-L transmission modes at will. The only exceptions are later production years of third-generation Jimnys (more info in a dedicated chapter), which do not have a selection lever, but instead have servo-actuated mechanism to perform the same actions when invoked by the push of certain buttons in the cabin.

Factory rear axle differential locker 

LJ80, SJ410, and early SJ413 vehicles sold in Germany were fitted from the factory with a manually operated, mechanical rear axle differential locker. A cable connected the locker to a small, dedicated lever in the cabin near the hand brake lever. By operating the lever, the driver could manually fully (un)lock the rear axle differential.

The reason for inclusion of the differential locker was legislative in nature. LJ80s, SJ410s, and early SJ413s have a parking brake that brakes the gears in the transfer case instead of braking the individual rear wheels directly and simultaneously (as with most passenger vehicles). That design has several advantages, as well as an important disadvantage - because of the open rear differential, the hand brake has no effect when the transfer case is in two-wheel drive (rear-wheel drive) mode and when one of the rear wheels is raised in the air. Therefore, relying on the parking brake itself would be dangerous in some unusual situations (when parking on a severely undulated ground). German law required that this risk must not exist. Instead of redesigning the parking brake system for that market, Suzuki appeased the legal requirement by the inclusion of a rear differential locker. The idea was that German drivers, when parking, should lock both the hand brake lever and this additional differential lock lever.

Despite being formally intended as a parking brake assistance only, this rear axle differential locker is a fully fledged device. Therefore, it is perfectly usable and durable in all-terrain driving situations over undulated or very slippery ground.

Later SJ413s (and all Samurais) have a standard parking brake that works on both rear wheels directly. This design appeased the German legal requirement, so no differential locker has been factory fitted to SJ413s nor to any Samurai since.

A retrofit of a genuine rear differential locker to LJ80s, SJ410s and SJ413s which lack it, is possible by using the parts from a dismantled LJ80, SJ410, or early SJ413 which had that locker. Lockers from LJ80 are usable on another LJ80 only, while lockers should be interchangeable between SJ410 and SJ413 and vice versa. A retrofit from SJ41x onto a Samurai is not easily possible, because Samurai has wider track and axle than SJ41x.

HopeStar ON360
The vehicle was originally developed by the Hope Motor Company of Japan in 1967 and available as the HopeStar ON360 from April 1968. Brakes were Daihatsu units, the rear axle was sourced from the Mitsubishi Colt 1000, and the wheels were sourced from the Mitsubishi Jeep. It was a very basic two-seater vehicle with no doors, but a sturdy 4WD system allowed it to go off-road. The tiny Hope company sold very few ON360s, only 15 in the domestic market and another 30 exported to Southeast Asia, although 100 ME24 engines were purchased. Hope proceeded to sell the design to Suzuki in 1968, after Mitsubishi declined to take over production.

First generation (1970)

The compact off-road capable Suzuki Jimny was Suzuki's first global success, lending it name recognition and a foothold in markets worldwide. The Jimny slotted into a hitherto unfilled gap in the market.

LJ10
Suzuki's first move on acquiring the rights to the ON360 was rebodying it and replacing the Mitsubishi engine with an air-cooled  Suzuki "FB" two-cylinder, two-stroke, which produced . Since the new unit remained smaller than 360 cc, and Suzuki placed the spare tire inside the truck (making it a three-seater) to keep it under 3 m in overall length, it was classified as a kei car, conferring certain tax privileges and other benefits. When it was introduced in April 1970, it was the first four-wheel drive kei car to enter series production.

The original Jimny was an unexpected hit, with nearly 5,000 units selling in its home market in the first year, immediately outselling the market leader at the time, the Mitsubishi Jeep. Over 6,000 were sold in 1971. Production was initially subcontracted and was carried out mainly by hand, but Suzuki soon realized that the Jimny needed to have a dedicated assembly line to allow production to be ramped up.

LJ20
The LJ was updated in May 1972 and renamed the LJ20. The grille bars were changed from horizontal to vertical for the LJ20. The engine was replaced with an updated, water-cooled unit (the L50), and its  enabled the LJ to reach 80 km/h (50 mph). With production brought in house, Suzuki could now build 2,000 cars per month.

A special version with the spare tire mounted behind the passenger seat allowed for two small rear seats, facing each other. The introduction of left-hand drive signaled Suzuki's worldwide ambitions for the truck. The Hard Top (Van) was also introduced when the LJ20 arrived, equipped with smaller, 15 in wheels. Suzuki did not export them to America; a US company called International Equipment Co.  imported them. Export Jimnys had the spare tire mounted on the outside, as kei regulations on length did not apply.

Towards the end of LJ20 production, a cleaner  engine was introduced, a result of ever more stringent emissions regulations.

SJ10

For the home market, it first appeared in June 1976 as the Jimny 55 and reflected the changing kei-car rules and stricter emissions standards. The  vehicle could now hit 60 mph (97 km/h), and the spare tire was relocated outside the rear door, allowing for a fourth seat. The SJ10 Jimny originally used the "LJ50" name in most export markets; this was changed to LJ55 with the introduction of the LJ80 to align the names.

In May 1976, the low-production LJ51P long-wheelbase pickup became available for some export markets. The home-market Jimny 550 received a facelift in 1977, introducing rear wheel-arch metal flares and a bigger bonnet or hood with cooling slots above the radiator, while the export LJ50s were instead replaced by the LJ80 (same external modifications, but with the new four-stroke, four-cylinder, 797-cc engine fitted).

SJ20
The final iteration of the original Jimny design was the 1977 Jimny 8, called LJ80 in certain export markets. It was originally intended to be marketed as the Eljot ("Elliott") in Germany, but copyright issues with Disney's Pete's Dragon movie made this impossible. The LJ80V was also assembled in Indonesia, by P.T. Indo Mobil Utama in Jakarta.

The interior was also improved, with new seats and steering wheel. Metal doors became available for the first time in 1979, and a pickup truck model (LJ81) was available by April of that year, as well. The Jimny 8/LJ80 was retired in late 1981 with the introduction of the second-generation Jimny.

Second generation (1981) 

The Suzuki SJ30 began production in May 1981. In Japan, it was sold as the Suzuki Jimny and was a kei car, produced with both 550 cc and 660 cc 3-cylinder engines. The SJ-Series received a bigger engine and was lengthened and widened for export purposes, where it was sold with a multitude of names: Suzuki SJ410/413, Suzuki Samurai, Suzuki Sierra, Suzuki Potohar (Pakistan), Suzuki  (Thailand), Suzuki Katana (Indonesia), Chevrolet Samurai, Holden Drover (Australia) and Maruti Gypsy (India ).

SJ30 
The SJ30 Jimny 550 was mainly for Japanese domestic market consumption where it suited the Kei car category. Still powered by the LJ50 engine also used in its predecessor, the Jimny 550 was by a sizable margin the last two-stroke car engine built in Japan. Production ended with the withdrawal of type approval in November 1987 in favor of its F5A-engined brother, the JA71. The two-stroke had been favored by Japanese off-roaders (and by Suzuki) due to its light weight and superior low-speed torque.

SJ40 

The SJ40 Jimny 1000 was introduced for 1982 to replace the LJ80 range. The Jimny 1000, sold as the Suzuki SJ410 in most export markets, used the F10A - a larger 1-litre version of the LJ's 0.8-litre four-cylinder engine. The Japanese market models claimed  at 5,000 rpm. So that owners of 550 cc Jimnys would not be able to retrofit the larger, wider wheels of the Jimny 1000 to their cars, the Japanese ministry of transportation dictated that Suzuki fit wheels with a different bolt pattern.

A four-speed manual transmission was standard, as were non-power assisted drum brakes front and rear. The SJ410 came as a half-door convertible, long-wheelbase pickup truck, two-door hardtop (called "Van" in Japan), raised-roof hardtop, and no-glass hardtop (panel van). In Japan, the pickup truck was intended as a bare-bones work vehicle and did not receive fender extensions, and had diagonal tires on black-painted steel wheels rather than the sportier wheels fitted to the regular Jimny. In the autumn of 1983 a covered long-wheelbase version was added for export markets.

The SJ410 was also produced in Spain by Santana Motor in their Linares, Jaén factory as of March 1985 and was sold as a domestic vehicle in Europe due to its over 60% native parts content, thereby evading limits on imports of Japanese-built automobiles. It was built only on the short wheelbase, as a two-door convertible and commercial, or with the three door wagon or van bodywork. Some later models of the SJ410 would switch to disk brakes in the front depending on the factory they were made at. In March 1990, Santana-built versions received the same chassis developments which turned the SJ413 into the Samurai; this version was sold as Samurai 1.0 where it was offered ("Samurai Mil" in Spain). Cooper Motor Corporation (CMC) of Nairobi, Kenya, also assembled the SJ410 in the mid-eighties.

Indonesian production 

The SJ410 was also assembled in Indonesia by Suzuki Indomobil Motor since late 1982 until 2006, where it was marketed with different names. The original version was marketed as Suzuki Super Jimny, continuing from the previous LJ Suzuki Jimny. The canvas soft-top model was marketed in fairly small numbers from 1983 until late 1985 as Jimny Sierra. In the late 1980s, responding to the introduction of higher taxes for vehicles with four-wheel-drive, Suzuki introduced a 4x2 version as the Suzuki Katana in September 1989. The earlier model built until 1984 were low-roof, metal-bodied wagons. A higher-roofed model arrived in 1984 and continued to be built until about 1988, while the Katana has an even higher roof than the previous versions. Later, there were also 1.3-liter models sold in small numbers as the Jimny Samurai.

As of September 1989, it received updated square headlights. The rear-wheel drive Katana was also used as a basis for an Indonesian-built, 1930s' style kit-car called the Marvia Classic. The earlier Katana is only available with "Blitz" variant until a light facelift in late 1992 (round headlights) and mid 1993 (new grille design with round headlights and S logo). In the same year, the Blitz variant was replaced with the long-running GX series Katana. The Suzuki Katana GX was produced from 1993 to 2006, with updates only on body sticker design in 1995, 1997, 1999, 2000, 2002, and 2005. There was also a DX variant of Katana below the GX, marketed from 1993 to 2000. In 2005, Suzuki introduced the SJ413  spacecab pickup, which was imported from Thailand until 2007. Production of the second generation Jimny (and Katana) in Indonesia ended in 2006.

Maruti Gypsy 

The Indian built SJ-410 has only ever been available in a long-wheelbase version. The Gypsy remained in production for the Indian Subcontinent market until 2019. The version still produced in India by Maruti Suzuki was the Maruti Gypsy King, using the sixteen valve,  1.3-liter G13 engine. The Gypsy King is still popular with the Indian armed forces and police units.

Farm Worker 4x4 
In 2013, Suzuki New Zealand reintroduced the Suzuki SJ series into New Zealand badged as the Suzuki Farm Worker 4x4, although the Maruti badge can clearly be seen in the centre of the radiator grille. The Farm Worker is available in four slightly differing styles, two having a rear window and fibreglass bulkhead, and two having canvas roofs with foldable front windscreens, all based on the long wheelbase version (the only version built by Maruti) and offering a maximum payload of 500 kg. As its name suggests the Farm Worker is intended for farm work only and is not able to be road registered due to the vehicle not meeting current crash protection regulations, although it does come with seat belts for the front two seats.

SJ413/Samurai

JA51 1300 
In 1984, the SJ was revamped with the launch of the SJ413 (internal model code JA51). The SJ413 included a larger 1.3-liter four-cylinder engine, 5-speed manual transmission and power brakes (disc brakes on the front and drum brakes on the rear) all around. The body and interior were also redesigned, with the introduction of a roll bar, along with a new dashboard, seats, and grille. The SJ410 remained in production for various other markets with the old specifications. After the 1988 introduction of the Escudo, sales of the Jimny 1300 ended in Japan. The model returned to the Japanese market in May 1993, after a thorough update.

SJ413 had the same track width as SJ410. As those two car models were relatively susceptible to a rollover, Suzuki introduced a wider edition of SJ413 around 1988, with its track widened by 10 cm. Wider track gave the vehicle more stability. This wider edition received the nameplate "Samurai". The difference in width is the only major difference between SJ413 and Samurai, apart from some minor cosmetic changes in the interior and the exterior.

The Samurai was also produced in a long wheel base (LWB) edition for certain markets, but still with three doors. That LWB edition still had only two rear seats (if fitted at all) for two rear passengers, and the rear passenger leg room was the same as in the standard SWB edition. The extended vehicle length only affected the boot/trunk space behind the rear seats, which was significantly larger in the LWB edition.

North American market 
The SJ-Series Samurai was introduced to the United States in 1985 for the 1986 model year. It had gone on sale earlier in Canada and Puerto Rico (as the Suzuki SJ410). It was priced at $6200 when introduced in the United States and 47,000 were sold in its first year. It had a 1.3-liter, four-cylinder engine and was available as a convertible or a hardtop, and came equipped with rear seats until 1994. The Suzuki Samurai became intensely popular within the serious 4WD community for its good off-road performance and reliability compared to other 4WDs of the time, outselling the Jeep Wrangler by two to one in 1987. This is due to the fact that while very compact and light, it is a real 4WD vehicle equipped with a transfer case, switchable 4WD and low range. Its lightness makes it a very nimble off-roader less prone to sinking in softer ground than heavier vehicles. It was also sold as the Chevrolet Samurai in Puerto Rico.

The 1988.5 model Samurai was re-tuned for better on-road use in the United States. This revision included softer suspension settings and a larger anti-roll bar to reduce body roll. A lower fifth gear (.865:1 vs the earlier .795:1) increased engine speed and power on the highway, and improved dashboard and seats made the Samurai more comfortable.

The Samurai was supplemented in Canada and the United States markets in 1989 by the Suzuki Sidekick, which eventually replaced the Samurai in 1995. The rear seat was removed from 1994 and 1995 Samurai models with rear shoulder safety belts becoming mandatory, and the partial roll cage not having the required mounting provisions, unlike the larger Jeep Wrangler. Low sales and pending stricter safety legislation prompted the withdrawal of the Samurai from Canada and the United States markets after 1995.

Consumers Union lawsuit 

An unfavorable 1988 review  in Consumer Reports magazine said the Samurai was unsafe and prone to rollovers. In 1996, after investigating the CU's claims, Suzuki of North America sued the  magazine's publisher, Consumers Union (CU), for libel. The suit resulted in an inconclusive settlement. CU agreed that it "never intended to imply that the Samurai easily rolls over in routine driving conditions." CU and Suzuki made a joint statement, saying, "CU and Suzuki disagree with respect to the validity" of CU's tests and that "Suzuki disputes the validity" of the tests, while "CU stands by its test protocol and findings."

Ranger kitcar 
Rickman Cars developed a GFRP-bodied copy of the Samurai called the Rickman Ranger. Strictly a rear-wheel-drive vehicle, it uses the underpinnings of a Mark II Ford Escort. It was produced in the UK as a kitcar and later in Russia by Avtokam. Rickman, and later the Lomax Company, produced over 1000 vehicles. Avtokam and later Velta produced around 150 further kits. The Velta plant went bankrupt in 2006. Rickman also made a camper version known as the Rancher.

Other markets 
 The SJ413/Samurai had a longer history in the rest of the world. Australian market JA51s were sold as either Suzuki Sierra or Holden Drover, while those built in Thailand are called Suzuki . The  has also been available as the " Sporty", a unique LWB extended cab pickup.

Due to various trade obstacles for Japanese cars, Spanish Santana Motors (in addition to the SJ410) began local production of the SJ413 in 1986. The Santana built SJs had softer springs for an improved on-road ride, color coordinated interiors with cloth seats and carpeted floors, all to broaden appeal to those who did not intend to primarily off-road the vehicle. In 1989 it received some optical as well as chassis updates and received the "Samurai" nameplate. Santana-built Samurais did not benefit from the updated coil sprung chassis introduced around 1996, instead receiving a facelift (new grille, more rounded bumpers) specific to European and neighboring markets. Also around 1998, Santana developed a version which used PSA's XUD 9 1.9-litre turbodiesel engine, producing . Top speed is 130 km/h (80.8 mph). Santana then replaced this diesel Samurai edition with another diesel edition sometime in year 2001, based on Renault's F8Q 1.9-litre non-turbo diesel engine, producing ). Santana also produced petrol editions alongside the diesel editions.

The Samurai was sold in Colombia and Venezuela as Chevrolet Samurai, assembled in Bogotá, Colombia by General Motors Colmotores. In other South American markets (Argentina, Bolivia, Brazil, Chile, Peru, Paraguay and Uruguay) it was sold as the Suzuki Samurai. Long wheelbase models were not offered in the Mercosur.

In Asia the SJ/Samurai was sold under a few different names. In Thailand it was called the Suzuki . The Thai market also received a special version called the "Suzuki  Sporty", a pickup with an extended cab with a small rear seat best suited for occasional use.

High altitude world record 

The Samurai in question benefited from wheel, tire, and suspension changes, and a supercharged G16A 4-cylinder engine. It was the third attempt for the two man team, after encountering weather difficulties on the first attempt and an engine fire in the second. The previous record holder's team led by Matthias Jeschke driving a Jeep Wrangler, left a sign reading "Jeep Parking Only: All others don't make it up here anyway". The Chilean team found the sign, blown down by strong winds, and brought it back to civilization as a souvenir.

This record was duly certified by the Guinness World Record in July 2007.

On December 13, 2019, Jeschke reclaimed the record with a Mercedes Benz Unimog.

Kei history 
 In January 1986 the JA71, a four-stroke, turbocharged and fuel-injected (F5A)  three-cylinder engine was introduced to complement the two-stroke SJ30. It used the upgraded interior from the Jimny 1300, which was simultaneously introduced to the SJ30. The non-intercooled engine continued to be offered in the lowest spec Van version. At the same time, a glassed high-roof version ("Panoramic Roof") was added.

660 cc Era 
The JA71 was replaced in March 1990 by the new JA11 as new Kei category regulations took effect. A utilitarian van (HA), as well as more luxurious Hardtop, Convertible, and Panoramic Roof (HC, CC, EC) versions were on offer. The suspension was also upgraded, while a longer front bumper meant that the foglights could be mounted in front of the grille rather than in it.

Coil spring edition 

The Samurai continued for sale outside the United States (where the newer version is referred to as the 'Coily'), with a substantial update in November 1995. This included a coil spring suspension, though both live axles were retained. The rest of the truck was redesigned as well, with new seats, dashboard, steering wheel, doors and front grille.

There were three Samurai coil sprung models.
 The JA12 used the  F6A three-cylinder engine from the JA11.
 The JA22 received the newly developed and more powerful K6A engine.
 The JB32 received the larger ,  G13BB 16-valve engine. It was slightly longer and wider than the other two models, due to larger bumpers and fenders. This model also bears the designation SJ80. This was the model seen in most export markets, although abroad it was usually equipped with the eight-valve,  G13BA engine instead.

Additional notes:
 As far as it is known, no coil sprung Samurai has ever been produced in a long wheel base edition, but there have been some produced with a raised roof ("high roof") and soft/open top ("cabrio").
 Some vehicle parts are specific to coil sprung Samurais compared to leaf sprung Samurais, and even later Jimny models - most suspension parts (obviously), transfer cases, several body panels, as well as most interior and exterior trim pieces.
 JB32 was sold in Europe only during the years 1997 and 1998, and is therefore very rare in Europe, with the availability of the parts specific to JB32 being almost non-existent in local European markets.

Not all production plants switched over to produce coil sprung Samurais. The most notable examples are Maruti Suzuki plant in India (Producing it as the Maruti Gypsy) (still produces the original narrow SJ410 as of year 2020) and Santana plant in Spain (continued producing leaf-sprung Samurais until year 2004). While the third-generation Jimny replaced the Jimny/Samurai in most markets after 1998, it still remains in production in India.

Third generation (1998)

At the 1997 Tokyo Motor Show, Suzuki presented the all-new Jimny with a much more modern design. A ladder type chassis and a dual-ratio transfer case were retained, unlike many competing compact 4WDs which lack a low range, and are strictly in the crossover category. Two versions are available in export markets: a standard hard top and the Canvas Top, introduced at the Barcelona Motor Show in May 1999 and was built only by Santana in Spain between 1999 and 2009. The Jimny replaced the popular Sierra/Samurai model in most markets (European introduction was in Paris, 1998), though its predecessor remains in limited production in some places. For the domestic market, a 660 cc K6A-engined version suited for the Kei Jidosha class is responsible for most Jimny sales.

The larger 1.3-litre Jimny was originally equipped with the G13BB engine also used in the JB32. The  G13BB engine was replaced in Japan with the January 2000 introduction of the newly designed VVT 16-valve M-engine, but soldiered on in Spanish-built softtops until 2005. For the continental European market, where the diesel cars hold a significant market share, in 2004 the turbo-diesel Jimny JB53 was introduced, built by Santana and using a Renault-built DDiS 1,461 cc K9K engine. It was discontinued in 2011, and was never available in Britain and Ireland.

The Jimny has a part-time 4WD system controlled by three dashboard buttons: 2WD, 4WD, and 4WD-L. The default is 2WD, powering the rear wheels. When 4WD is pressed, the front wheels are also engaged in high gear. The 4WD-L engages all wheels in a  lower gear ratio. Being a part-time 4WD, there is no center differential or viscous coupling to allow for speed differences between the front and rear wheels, so only two-wheel drive mode works well on dry pavement. In Japan, the "Sierra" name was revived in January 2002, when 1.3-litre Jimnys began to be sold as the "Jimny Sierra" rather than as the "Jimny Wide".

The Jimny's vacuum-locking hubs allow it to be shifted from 2WD to 4WD while travelling at up to 100 km/h (62 mph). Shifting to low range requires the vehicle to be stopped, but no need to exit the vehicle exists. Newer Jimnys have electronic push-button selectable four-wheel drive, which requires the vehicle to be stopped with the clutch depressed and transmission in neutral to select low range.

The Jimny has large windows, giving excellent visibility, apart from a rather serious blind spot caused by the oversized "B" pillar. The large amount of glass also magnifies the greenhouse effect, and the Jimny comes with air conditioning standard in some regions.

In Europe, both Hard Top and Canvas Top versions come in JX and JLX specifications. These are fairly standard designations across the Suzuki off-road range, with the JLX being the fully optioned "luxury" version. In the case of the Jimny, the JLX adds roof rails, power steering, power windows, power-adjustable exterior mirrors, and several interior comfort improvements. Both models are available with a five-speed manual or four-speed automatic gearbox. The 2WD option is only available as a five-speed manual.

In 2009, Santana Motor of Spain ended its agreement with Suzuki to make the Canvas Top version, which has not been available since then. In 2011, Santana Motor went bankrupt. The Souza Ramos Group of Brazil, which used to make Mitsubishi cars under license, will start manufacturing the Suzuki Jimny in 2012 in Brazil to compensate for the loss of production capacity from Santana Motor. Whether the Canvas Top version will be manufactured also in Brazil is not known.

As in Japan, Jimnys in Australia have borne the name Jimny Sierra since 2007, largely due to the Sierra name having become synonymous with small, capable off-road vehicles. Since 1999, GM Colmotores have been assembling the 1.3-litre,  JB33 with the name "Chevrolet Jimny" in Bogotá, Colombia. The Jimny is also available as a parallel import in Singapore.

In 2012, for the 2013 model year, the Jimny received a front facelift, giving it a more angular grille and front bumper, and including a hood scoop. For the Indonesian market, the facelifted Jimny was launched at the 25th Gaikindo Indonesia International Auto Show on 10 August 2017, and 88 units were sold exclusively for a limited time only.

Production of third generation Jimny ceased worldwide (except in Brazil) in 2018 after 20 years of production, as Suzuki retooled in preparation of the fourth generation's launch in late 2018.

In 2021, a British company called Yomper 4×4 started to produce a couple of pickups based on the third generation Jimny, with their Bergan model having a shorter wheelbase than the version known as the Yomper 4×4 Commercial. In 2022, Suzuki Brazil stopped production of the third generation Jimny at their Catalao plant, due to new regulations which meant they could not use the car's 1.3-liter M13A engine without updating it. At that time Suzuki Brazil's range consisted of two Jimny models, with the fourth generation model known as the "Jimny Sierra" and the facelifted third generation on sale in four different versions (all with M13A engine)  with the Jimny 4Work being the base model and the Jimny Forest being the top-of-the-range model.

Mazda AZ-Offroad

The Mazda AZ-Offroad, introduced in October 1998, is a rebadged Jimny. The AZ in the name refers to Autozam, Mazda's ill-fated small car marque. It is fitted with the turbocharged 658-cc DOHC Suzuki K6A engine, which produces . Manually operated four-wheel drive is standard with autolocking front hubs and low range, whilst an automatic transmission is optional.

Fourth generation (2018)

The fourth generation Jimny. and Jimny Sierra were launched in Japan on 5 July 2018, with styling reminiscent of the earlier LJ and SJ Jimny generations. Production commenced in Japan on 29 May 2018 at Suzuki's Kosai plant.

Subsequently, due to its high  emissions and tightening EU emissions standards, the Jimny was withdrawn from sale in European markets in 2020, to be reintroduced in 2021 as a commercial vehicle (without rear seats and with a partition separating luggage space from the front seats), and therefore subject to less stringent emissions limits.

In January 2023, Suzuki released the long-wheelbase 5-door version of the Jimny, based on the Sierra version.

Design
The body-on-chassis design uses a ladder frame, 3-link rigid axle suspension with coil spring, and part-time four-wheel drive with low range transfer gear, marketed as ALLGRIP PRO. Transmission options are a 5-speed manual transmission and a 4-speed automatic.

The exterior has upright A-pillars, a flat clamshell bonnet/hood, driver and passenger window lines that dip at the front to extend visibility, a simple black grille with round headlamps, roof edge drip rails, and prominent wheel arch extensions. The interior rear luggage space can be expanded by folding twin rear seats, creating a 377-litre luggage space with a flat floor, five utility screw holes and four luggage anchors. The design results in an approach angle of 37 degrees, ramp breakover angle of 28 degrees and departure angle of 49 degrees.

The Jimny incorporates a series of safety features, marketed by Suzuki as Suzuki Safety Support. The Dual Sensor Brake Support (DSBS) system determines if there is a risk of forward collision and issues an audio and visual warning, increases braking force, or applies automatic braking to either avoid a collision or minimize damage. Other functions include lane departure warning, weaving alert function and high beam assist, which automatically switches between high and low beams.

Engines
The base Japanese market Jimny is powered by an R06A 658 cc, three-cylinder, turbocharged petrol engine, while the wide version (Jimny Sierra) has a newly developed K15B 1.5-litre four-cylinder naturally aspirated petrol engine ( at 6,000 rpm,  at 4,400 rpm).

Markets

Southeast Asia
The fourth-generation Jimny was displayed in Indonesia at the 26th Gaikindo Indonesia International Auto Show in August 2018 and at the 27th Indonesia International Motor Show through April to May 2019, and launched at the 27th Gaikindo Indonesia International Auto Show on 18 July 2019. It was also unveiled at PIMS 2018 for the Philippine market, and then the Jimny was launched at the 40th Bangkok International Motor Show on 26 March 2019 for the Thai market. In September 2021, the Jimny was introduced in Malaysia, with a sole 1.5-litre VVT engine with a four-speed auto gearbox.

Mexico 
The Jimny was introduced in the Mexican market on 12 November 2020. It is only offered in the GLX trim level in both manual and automatic.

India 
Assembly of the Jimny started in India since January 2021 solely for export markets. The 3-door Indian-assembled Jimny has been exported to African markets and countries in the Middle East. In January 2023, the 5-door Jimny was introduced for the domestic market. The model is exclusively available at the Nexa dealership chain reserved for high-end Maruti Suzuki models.

Safety

Electric version 

An electric version of the Jimny is confirmed and scheduled to release around 2030.

Development history 
These four collapsed tables cover the development history of the Jimny in the Japanese domestic market, with notable export variations and developments also noted.

References

Further reading

External links

 
Official website (New Zealand)
official website (Australia)
 Jimny subreddit
 2019 Jimny offroad review – Autocar magazine video

Mini sport utility vehicles
Kei sport utility vehicles
Convertibles
Vans
Jimny
1980s cars
1990s cars
2000s cars
2010s cars
Cars introduced in 1970
Off-road vehicles
Product safety scandals
Kei cars
Retro-style automobiles
Cars powered by longitudinal 4-cylinder engines